Kobierzyce  is a village in Wrocław County, Lower Silesian Voivodeship, in south-western Poland. It is the seat of the administrative district (gmina) called Gmina Kobierzyce.

The village has a population of 2,095.

History
The oldest known mention of the village comes from a document of Duke Henry III the White from 1257, when it was part of fragmented Piast-ruled Poland. Its name is of Polish origin, and comes from the word kobierzec, referring to its role as a center of weaving.

It was the location for Rudolf Steiner's Agriculture Course in 1924. It was a course of eight lectures, there were 111 attendees from six countries, it led to the development of biodynamic agriculture, and it has been described as  "the first organic agriculture course".

Transport
There is a train station in the village.

Sports
The village is home to KPR Kobierzyce, women's handball club, which competes in the Polish Women's Superliga, the country's top division.

References

Villages in Wrocław County